The White movement also known as the Whites (Бѣлые / Белые, Beliye), was a loose confederation of anti-communist forces that fought the communist Bolsheviks, also known as the Reds, in the Russian Civil War and that to a lesser extent continued operating as militarized associations of insurrectionists both outside and within Russian borders in Siberia until roughly World War II (1939–1945). The movement's military arm was the White Army (Бѣлая армія / Белая армия, Belaya armiya), also known as the White Guard (Бѣлая гвардія / Белая гвардия, Belaya gvardiya) or White Guardsmen (Бѣлогвардейцы / Белогвардейцы, Belogvardeytsi).

During the Russian Civil War the White movement functioned as a big-tent political movement representing an array of political opinions in Russia united in their opposition to the Bolsheviks—from the republican-minded liberals and Kerenskyite social democrats on the left through monarchists and supporters of a united multinational Russia to the ultra-nationalist Black Hundreds on the right.

Following the military defeat of the Whites, remnants and continuations of the movement remained in several organizations, some of which only had narrow support, enduring within the wider White émigré overseas community until after the fall of the European communist states in the Eastern European Revolutions of 1989 and the subsequent dissolution of the Soviet Union in 1990–1991. This community-in-exile of anti-communists often divided into liberal and the more conservative segments, with some still hoping for the restoration of the Romanov dynasty.

Structure and ideology 
In the Russian context after 1917, "White" had three main connotations which were:
 Political contra-distinction to "the Reds", whose revolutionary Red Army supported the Bolshevik government.
 Historical reference to absolute monarchy, specifically recalling Russia's first Tsar, Ivan III (reigned 1462–1505), at a period when some styled the ruler of Muscovy Albus Rex ("the White King").
 The white uniforms of Imperial Russia worn by some White Army soldiers.

Ideology 

The White movement emerged as the first major opponent of the Bolsheviks. It portrayed itself as necessary for the maintenance of law and order in revolutionary Russia, and repressed Soviet organizations and functionaries in White-controlled territory.

Overall, the White Army was nationalistic and rejected ethnic particularism and separatism. The White Army generally believed in a united multinational Russian State and opposed separatists who wanted to create nation-states besides Russia.

Violent antisemitism was rife in the White movement. British Minister of Munitions Winston Churchill personally warned General Anton Denikin, formerly of the Imperial Army and later a major White military leader, whose forces effected pogroms and persecutions against the Jews: [M]y task in winning support in Parliament for the Russian Nationalist cause will be infinitely harder if well-authenticated complaints continue to be received from Jews in the zone of the Volunteer Armies.

Many of the White leaders accepted autocracy while remaining suspicious of "politics," which they characterized as consisting of speeches, elections, and party activities. Aside from being anti-Bolshevik and anti-communist, the Whites had no set ideology or main leader. The White Armies did acknowledge the Provisional All-Russian Government, but this was relevant only during the campaigns of 1918–1920 of Admiral Alexander Kolchak, formerly of the previous Russian Imperial Navy.

The movement had no set foreign policy directives but what existed was based on Russia's traditional alliances. Russian Whites differed on policies toward the German Empire in its extended occupation of western Russia, the Baltic states, Poland and Ukraine on the Eastern Front, debating whether or not to ally with it. The Whites wanted to keep from alienating any potential supporters and allies and thus saw an exclusively monarchist position as a detriment to their cause and recruitment. White movement leaders such as Denikin advocated for civilians to create their own pro-White government. Admiral Alexander Kolchak succeeded in creating a temporary wartime government in Omsk, acknowledged by most other White leaders, only for it to fall with the loss of his armies.

Some warlords who were aligned with the White movement, such as Grigory Semyonov and Roman Ungern von Sternberg, did not acknowledge any political authority but their own. Consequently, the White Army movement had no specific unifying political convictions beyond general Russian nationalism, as members could be monarchists, republicans, conservative rightists, or Kadets. Among White Army leaders, neither General Lavr Kornilov nor Denikin was a monarchist. General Pyotr Nikolayevich Wrangel was a monarchist willing to soldier for a republican Russian government. Moreover, some socialists supported the anti-Bolshevik White Army, among them the Socialist-Revolutionary Party, and others who opposed Lenin's October Revolution of 1917. Some changed sides, in both directions.

Unlike the Bolsheviks, the White Armies did not share a single ideology, methodology, or political goal beyond anti-Sovietism. They were led by conservative generals with different agendas and methods, and for the most part they operated quite independently of each other, with little coordination or cohesion. The composition and command structure of the White armies also varied, some containing hardened veterans of World War I, others more recent volunteers. These differences and divisions, along with their inability to offer an alternative government and win popular support, prevented the White armies from winning the Civil War.

Structure

White Army 

The Volunteer Army in South Russia became the most prominent and the largest of the various and disparate White forces. Starting off as a small and well-organized military in January 1918, the Volunteer Army soon grew. The Kuban Cossacks joined the White Army and conscription of both peasants and Cossacks began. In late February 1918,  soldiers under the command of General Aleksei Kaledin were forced to retreat from Rostov-on-Don due to the advance of the Red Army. In what became known as the Ice March, they traveled to Kuban in order to unite with the Kuban Cossacks, most of whom did not support the Volunteer Army. In 1919 the Don Cossacks joined the Army. The White Army's rank-and-file comprised active anti-Bolsheviks, such as Cossacks, nobles, and peasants, as conscripts and as volunteers.

The White movement had access to various naval forces, both seagoing and riverine, especially the Black Sea Fleet.

Aerial forces available to the Whites included the Slavo-British Aviation Corps (S.B.A.C.). The Russian ace Alexander Kazakov operated within this unit.

Administration 
The White movement's leaders and first members came mainly from the ranks of military officers.  Many came from outside the nobility, such as generals Mikhail Alekseev and Anton Denikin, who originated in serf families, or General Lavr Kornilov, a Cossack.

The White generals never mastered administration; they often utilized "prerevolutionary functionaries" or "military officers with monarchististic inclinations" for administering White-controlled regions.

The White Armies were often lawless and disordered.  Also, White-controlled territories had multiple different and varying currencies with unstable exchange-rates. The chief currency, the Volunteer Army's ruble, had no gold backing.

Ranks and insignia

Theatres of operation 

The Whites and the Reds fought the Russian Civil War from November 1917 until 1921, and isolated battles continued in the Far East until 1923. The White Army—aided by the Allied forces (Triple Entente) from countries such as Japan, the United Kingdom, France, Greece, Italy and the United States and (sometimes) the Central Powers forces such as Germany and Austria-Hungary—fought in Siberia, Ukraine, and the Crimea. They were defeated by the Red Army due to military and ideological disunity, as well as the determination and increasing unity of the Red Army.

The White Army operated in three main theatres:

Southern front 

White organising in the South started on 15 November 1917, (Old Style) under General Mikhail Alekseev (1857–1918). In December 1917, General Lavr Kornilov took over the military command of the newly named Volunteer Army until his death in April 1918, after which General Anton Denikin took over, becoming head of the "Armed Forces of the South of Russia" in January 1919.

The Southern Front featured massive-scale operations and posed the most dangerous threat to the Bolshevik Government. At first it depended entirely upon volunteers in Russia proper, mostly the Cossacks, among the first to oppose the Bolshevik Government. On 23 June 1918, the Volunteer Army (8,000–9,000 men) began its so-called Second Kuban Campaign with support from Pyotr Krasnov. By September, the Volunteer Army comprised 30,000 to 35,000 members, thanks to mobilization of the Kuban Cossacks gathered in the North Caucasus. Thus, the Volunteer Army took the name of the Caucasus Volunteer Army. On 23 January 1919, the Volunteer Army under Denikin oversaw the defeat of the 11th Soviet Army and then captured the North Caucasus region. After capturing the Donbas, Tsaritsyn and Kharkiv in June, Denikin's forces launched an attack towards Moscow on 3 July, (N.S.). Plans envisaged 40,000 fighters under the command of General Vladimir May-Mayevsky storming the city.

After General Denikin's attack upon Moscow failed in 1919, the Armed Forces of the South of Russia retreated. On 26 and 27 March 1920, the remnants of the Volunteer Army evacuated from Novorossiysk to the Crimea, where they merged with the army of Pyotr Wrangel.

Eastern (Siberian) front 

The Eastern Front started in spring 1918 as a secret movement among army officers and right-wing socialist forces. In that front, they launched an attack in collaboration with the Czechoslovak Legions, who were then stranded in Siberia by the Bolshevik Government, who had barred them from leaving Russia, and with the Japanese, who also intervened to help the Whites in the east. Admiral Alexander Kolchak headed the eastern White counter-revolutionary army and a provisional Russian government. Despite some significant success in 1919, the Whites were defeated being forced back to Far Eastern Russia, where they continued fighting until October 1922. When the Japanese withdrew, the Soviet army of the Far Eastern Republic retook the territory. The Civil War was officially declared over at this point, although Anatoly Pepelyayev still controlled the Ayano-Maysky District at that time. Pepelyayev's Yakut revolt, which concluded on 16 June 1923, represented the last military action in Russia by a White Army. It ended with the defeat of the final anti-communist enclave in the country, signalling the end of all military hostilities relating to the Russian Civil War.

Northern and Northwestern fronts 

Headed by Nikolai Yudenich, Evgeni Miller, and Anatoly Lieven, the White forces in the North demonstrated less co-ordination than General Denikin's Army of Southern Russia. The Northwestern Army allied itself with Estonia, while Lieven's West Russian Volunteer Army sided with the Baltic nobility. Authoritarian support led by Pavel Bermondt-Avalov and Stanisław Bułak-Bałachowicz played a role as well. The most notable operation on this front, Operation White Sword, saw an unsuccessful advance towards the Russian capital of Petrograd in the autumn of 1919.

Post-Civil War 

The defeated anti-Bolshevik Russians went into exile, congregating in Belgrade, Berlin, Paris, Harbin, Istanbul, and Shanghai. They established military and cultural networks that lasted through World War II (1939–1945), e.g., the Russian community in Harbin and the Russian community in Shanghai. Afterward, the White Russians' anti-Communist activists established a home base in the United States, to which numerous refugees emigrated.

Moreover, in the 1920s and the 1930s the White Movement established organisations outside Russia, which were meant to depose the Soviet Government with guerrilla warfare, e.g., the Russian All-Military Union, the Brotherhood of Russian Truth, and the National Alliance of Russian Solidarists, a far-right anticommunist organization founded in 1930 by a group of young White emigres in Belgrade, Yugoslavia. Some White émigrés adopted pro-Soviet sympathies and were termed "Soviet patriots". These people formed organizations such as the Mladorossi, the Eurasianists, and the Smenovekhovtsy. A Russian cadet corps was established to prepare the next generation of anti-Communists for the "spring campaign"—a hopeful term denoting a renewed military campaign to reconquer Russia from the Soviet Government. In any event, many cadets volunteered to fight for the Russian Corps during the Second World War, when some White Russians participated in the Russian Liberation Movement.

After the war, active anti-Soviet combat was almost exclusively continued by the National Alliance of Russian Solidarists. Other organizations either dissolved, or began concentrating exclusively on self-preservation and/or educating the youth. Various youth organizations, such as the Russian Scouts-in-Exteris, promoted providing children with a background in pre-Soviet Russian culture and heritage. Some supported Zog I of Albania during the 1920s and a few independently served with the Nationalists during the Spanish Civil War. White Russians also served alongside the Soviet Red Army during the Soviet invasion of Xinjiang and the Islamic rebellion in Xinjiang in 1937.

Prominent people 

 Mikhail Alekseyev
 Vladimir Antonov
 Nicholas Savich Bakulin
 Pavel Bermondt-Avalov
 Stanisław Bułak-Bałachowicz
 Anton Denikin
 Mikhail Diterikhs
 Mikhail Drozdovsky
 Alexander Dutov
 Dmitrii Fedotoff-White
 Ivan Ilyin
 Nikolay Iudovich Ivanov
 Alexey Kaledin
 Vladimir Kappel
 Alexander Kolchak
 Lavr Kornilov
 Pyotr Krasnov
 Mikhail Kvetsinsky
 Alexander Kutepov
 Anatoly Lieven
 Konstantin Mamontov
 Sergey Markov
 Vladimir May-Mayevsky
 Evgeny Miller
 Konstantin Petrovich Nechaev
 Viktor Pokrovsky
 Leonid Punin
 Aleksandr Rodzyanko
 Grigory Semyonov
 Andrei Shkuro
 Roman von Ungern-Sternberg
 Pyotr Nikolayevich Wrangel
 Sergei Wojciechowski
 Nikolai Yudenich
 Vladimir Kappel

Related movements 

After the February Revolution, in western Russia, Finland, Estonia, Latvia and Lithuania declared themselves independent, but they had substantial Communist or Russian military presence. Civil wars followed, wherein the anti-Communist side may be referred to as White Armies, e.g. the White Guard-led, partially conscripted army in Finland (valkoinen armeija). However, since they were nationalists, their aims were substantially different from the Russian White Army proper; for instance, Russian White generals never supported Finnish independence. The defeat of the Russian White Army made the point moot in this dispute. The countries remained independent and governed by non-Communist governments.

See also 

 Russian State (1918–1920)
 1st Infantry Brigade (South Africa)
 Allied intervention in the Russian Civil War
 Basmachi movement
 Czechoslovak Legions
 Estonian War of Independence
 Finnish Civil War
 Grand Orient of Russia’s Peoples
 Great Siberian Ice March
 Italian Legione Redenta
 Russian All-Military Union
 Russian diaspora
 White Terror (Russia)

References

Footnotes

Bibliography

External links 

 Anti-Bolshevik Russia in pictures
 Museum and Archives of the White Movement
  Memory and Honour Association
  History of the White Movement

 
Nationalist movements in Europe
Pan-Slavism
Russian Civil War
Russian nationalism
Anti-communism in Russia
Russian counter-revolutionaries
Nationalist movements in Asia
Russian nationalist organizations
Anti-communist organizations in Russia